Loch Borralan is a freshwater loch in the Assynt District of Sutherland in the Highland Council Area, northern Scotland.

Geography 
Finally there's the Alt Motel Located Just Northwest of the other Lodge. Both of these boost the tourism in the area, it's proximity to the A837 makes most people go here instead of the nearby albeit larger Loch Urigill. Flowing into the loch there's the Ault an Loin Duibh and the much smaller Allt nan Cealgach and the Allt na Meine. Flowing Outward there's the Ledmore river which flows towards Loch Veyatie and eventually the Atlantic Ocean. There are also nearby peaks of Bad na Cleithe, Cnoc Gorm and Cnoc bad na h-Achlaise.

Tourism 
Loch Borralan is a tourist attraction given its location.

Geology 
The areas around Loch Borrolan are full of Igneous rocks such as borolanite. Which is typically white-spotted nepheline syenite unique to this area. Other rocks like pyroxene-rich mafic rock can be found blended in, overall there's a large range of particular rocks found around the banks of the loch. Largely in a nearby disused quarry.

References 

Freshwater lochs of Scotland
Kirkaig Basin